"A Rose for Ecclesiastes" is a science fiction short story by American author  Roger Zelazny, first published in the November 1963 issue of The Magazine of Fantasy and Science Fiction with a special wraparound cover painting by Hannes Bok.  It was nominated for the 1964 Hugo Award for Short Fiction.

Plot summary 
The story is narrated by a gifted human linguist and poet named Gallinger, who is part of a mission studying Mars.  He becomes the first human to learn the "high language" of the intelligent Martians, and to be allowed to read their sacred texts. He comes to believe that Martian culture is essentially fatalistic, following an event in the distant past that left the long-lived Martians sterile.

The Martian high priestess regards Gallinger highly, and over the course of months, his theological and poetical discussion elevate him to a status something like a prophet. Ultimately, he is seduced by a Martian temple dancer and impregnates her, the first such pregnancy on the planet in hundreds of years. The Martians appear not to take this well, as it contradicts their religion's expectation of extinction.

Gallinger sets out to do two things: he translates the Biblical book of Ecclesiastes, which he finds thematically similar to their religious texts, into the High Tongue. As part of the cultural exchange he engages in with the High Priestess, he promises to bring her a rose,  since the Martians have never seen one. The ship's biologist grows a rose and gives it to Gallinger. 

In anger at Martian religious fatalism and impassioned by his love for the dancer and his child-to-be, Gallinger breaks into the temple during a closed service and reads to the Martians from his translation of Ecclesiastes. He mocks it as he reads it, stating:

He discovers that the Martian religion is more complicated than he had originally realized, as is his role in fulfilling prophecy. It has been prophesied that a stranger will "go shod in the temple", breaking in without removing all unclean items, restoring life to the Martian race and bringing something new.  His actions have brought life, and the High Priestess takes the rose vowing to learn how to grow the flower.

The story ends well for the Martians, though perhaps less so for Gallinger, who discovers his dancer was only fulfilling her religious duty by seducing him, not caring for him otherwise.  He attempts suicide, but,  when he wakes up,  he is in the infirmary, and he sees Mars through a port, growing farther away as the ship leaves Mars to return to Earth.

Reception and reprinting
"A Rose for Ecclesiastes" has been anthologized several times, including in Isaac Asimov Presents the Great SF Stories #25 (edited by Isaac Asimov and Martin H. Greenberg), The Doors of His Face, The Lamps of His Mouth, and Other Stories, and Science Fiction: The Science Fiction Research Association Anthology (edited by Patricia S. Warrick, Charles Waugh, and Martin H. Greenberg). It is regarded as one of Zelazny's best early stories and was included in The Science Fiction Hall of Fame Volume One, 1929-1964, an anthology of the greatest science fiction short stories prior to 1965, as judged by the Science Fiction Writers of America. The work has been viewed as an important example of New Wave stylistics. 

R. D. Mullen termed the story "perhaps the best story ever on Mars as a dying world".<ref>"Reviews: November 1975", Science Fiction Studies, November 1975</ref> Judith Merril praised it as "incomparable". Samuel R. Delany characterized "Rose" as a "wonderful and magical tale". The Oxford Companion to Twentieth-century Literature in English declares the story "rewrote the cliches of science fiction into augurs of renewal". Theodore Sturgeon called the story "one of the most beautifully written, skillfully composed and passionately expressed works of art to appear anywhere, ever."

"A Rose for Ecclesiastes" was included in Visions of Mars: First Library on Mars, a silica glass mini-DVD taken to Mars by the Phoenix Mars Lander in 2008.

In popular culture
Novelist and musician Steven Brust, a lifelong Zelazny fan, named his 1993 solo album A Rose for Iconoclastes'' after "A Rose for Ecclesiastes".

References

1963 short stories
Short stories set on Mars
Religion in science fiction
Short stories by Roger Zelazny
Works originally published in The Magazine of Fantasy & Science Fiction

External links
"A Rose for Ecclesiastes", Full text and audio versions online. Accessed 7/12/2017.